Anikina is a rural locality (a village) in Verkh-Invenskoye Rural Settlement, Kudymkarsky District, Perm Krai, Russia. The population was 18 as of 2010. There is 1 street.

Geography 
Anikina is located 38 km southwest of Kudymkar (the district's administrative centre) by road. Panyashor is the nearest rural locality.

References 

Rural localities in Kudymkarsky District